Eddie Lubanski (September 3, 1929 – November 8, 2010) was an American bowler whose competitive career spanned more than four decades, and whose achievements entered the Guinness book of World Records. He was named Bowler of the Year in 1959, and later served as bowling instructor and president of the Professional Bowlers Association. He was inducted into the Michigan Sports Hall of Fame, ABC Hall of Fame, Polish American Sports Hall of Fame and City of Detroit Sports Hall of Fame. He had the highest lifetime average of 204 for over 25 years. On June 22, 1959 he bowled two consecutive 300 games. The event was televised from Miami and paired him with a female bowler. He bowled and if he did not strike, she would attempt a spare pick-up. She would bowl until she missed a strike. Lubanski bowled strikes for two games and she never attempted a spare. The following year,  Lubanski (768) teamed with fellow Detroiter Bob Kwolek (814) to establish a world record doubles total of 1582.

Lubanski was born in Detroit to Polish immigrants Edward and Josephine Lubanski. He was married for 62 years to Betty, and had four children: Janis, Edward, Paul and Robert.

References

American ten-pin bowling players
1929 births
2010 deaths
American people of Polish descent